Oman has participated in four AFC Asian Cups, in 2004, 2007, 2015 and 2019.

Prior to the 21st century, Oman generally struggled to qualify for the Asian Cup, having been considered as a much weaker side. It was the rise of Oman's national under-17 team that saw them have more opportunities to play on the international stage. Eventually, Oman qualified for their first Asian Cup in 2004, before managing to do so again in 2007, 2015 and 2019. Oman went out in the group stage in their first three participations, but in 2019 they set a new historical milestone by qualifying for the knockout stage for the first time in their history.

Overall results

Squads

2004 Asian Cup

2004 Asian Cup was Oman's first ever participation in continental stage. In here, debutant Oman was placed with Iran, Japan and Thailand. In spite of being considered as a basket point, Oman, however, demonstrated its football feat, and only ended in the group stage with a minor loss to defending champions Japan and a surprising draw to Iran.

Group D

2007 Asian Cup

Oman qualified for the second consecutive Asian Cup, this time, to meet up again with Thailand, Gulf rival Iraq and debutant Australia. Oman nonetheless impressed by making a stunning 1–1 draw to giant Australia; but a humiliating defeat to host Thailand and another draw with Iraq saw Oman crashed out from group stage for the second times.

Group A

2015 Asian Cup

Oman would make their third appearance in the tournament, in 2015. Same like 2007, they were placed in Group A again, with Australia, Kuwait and South Korea on board. Oman could not repeat the feat they did to South Korea and Australia before, when Oman lost two opening matches, and crashed out again. A late victory over Kuwait was too little, too late.

Group A

2019 Asian Cup

Oman was placed in a group including Uzbekistan, Turkmenistan and Japan, the latter of which is Asia's powerhouse. Oman opened their tournament with a 1–2 defeat to Uzbekistan, a match in which Oman played well but scored a controversial goal that should have been judged offside. Oman suffered its second defeat to Japan 0–1 due to a controversial penalty, forcing Oman to win against Turkmenistan to qualify to the knockout stage. Eventually, Oman beat Turkmenistan 3–1 to qualify for the first time, and this was seen as a success for Omani football. In their first knockout match of Oman's history however, they lost 0–2 to Iran and were eliminated from the tournament.

Group F

Knockout stage
Round of 16

References

Countries at the AFC Asian Cup